Doc and the Boys is the title of a recording by Doc Watson, released in 1976.

Doc and the Boys is out-of-print and was re-issued in 2003 by Southern Music packaged with Live and Pickin'.

Track listing
 "Darlin' Cory" (Traditional) – 2:38
 "Cypress Grove Blues" (Skip James) – 4:02
 "I Can't Help But Wonder (Where I'm Bound)" (Tom Paxton) – 2:54
 "The Girl I Love" (Traditional) – 2:41
 "Natural Born Gamblin' Man" (Tex Atchison, Merle Travis) – 2:24
 "Little Maggie" (Traditional) – 3:20
 "Love Please Come Home" (Leon Jackson) – 3:36
 "Spikedriver Blues" (Mississippi John Hurt) – 2:45
 "Southbound Passenger Train" (Traditional) – 2:23
 "Southern Lady" (John Hill) – 3:35
 "Tennessee Stud" (Jimmy Driftwood) – 4:42
Additional tracks on the Southern Music release:
 "All I Have to Do Is Dream" (Felice Bryant, Boudleaux Bryant) – 3:08

Personnel
Doc Watson – vocals, guitar
Merle Watson – guitar, banjo
T. Michael Coleman – bass, harmony vocals
Johnny Gimble – fiddle
Chuck Cochran – piano, keyboards, bass
Jim Isbell – drums
Allen Reynolds – background vocals
Garth Fundis – background vocals
Bob Hill – piano, washboard, pans, horns, bell, lead and harmony vocals
Joe Smothers – guitar, lead and harmony vocals

References

1976 albums
Doc Watson albums
United Artists Records albums